Paul Palmer may refer to:

 Paul Palmer (American football) (born 1964), American football player
 Paul Palmer (cricketer) (born 1992), Jamaican cricketer
 Paul Palmer (minister) (died 1747), American religious leader
 Paul Palmer (physicist) (1926–2011), American physicist
 Paul Palmer (swimmer) (born 1974), British swimmer

Paul Palmer may also refer to:
 Paul Palmer (schooner), a five-masted schooner built in 1902
Paul Palmer (shipwreck), 1902 shipwreck site in Massachusetts, USA

Palmer, Paul